Gordana Todorov (born July 24, 1949) is a mathematician working in noncommutative algebra, representation theory, Artin algebras, and cluster algebras. She is a professor of mathematics at Northeastern University.

Biography 
Todorov earned her Ph.D. in 1978, at Brandeis University. Her dissertation, Almost Split Sequences in the Representation Theory of Certain Classes of Artin Algebras, was supervised by Maurice Auslander.

Todorov is married to mathematician Kiyoshi Igusa, with whom she is a frequent co-author. The Igusa–Todorov functions and Igusa–Todorov endomorphism algebras are named for their joint work. Todorov is also the namesake of Todorov's theorem on preprojective partitions, and the Gentle–Todorov theorem on abelian categories.

References

External links
Home page

1949 births
Living people
20th-century American mathematicians
21st-century American mathematicians
American women mathematicians
Brandeis University alumni
Northeastern University faculty
Algebraists
21st-century American women